Sphaeniscus trifasciatus is a species of tephritid or fruit flies in the genus Sphaeniscus of the family Tephritidae.

Distribution
Jordan.

References

Tephritinae
Insects described in 2000
Diptera of Asia